The following lists events that happened during 1901 in Chile.

Incumbents
President of Chile: Federico Errázuriz Echaurren (until July 12), Aníbal Zañartu (until September 18), Germán Riesco

Events

June
25 June – Chilean presidential election, 1901

Births
1 April -Ernesto Chaparro (died 1957)

Deaths 
12 July – Federico Errázuriz Echaurren (born 1850)
17 September – Juan Esteban Rodríguez Segura (born 1818)

References 

 
Years of the 20th century in Chile
Chile